In mathematics, a Euclidean group is the group of (Euclidean) isometries of a Euclidean space ; that is, the transformations of that space that preserve the Euclidean distance between any two points (also called Euclidean transformations).  The group depends only on the dimension n of the space, and is commonly denoted E(n) or ISO(n).

The Euclidean group can be seen as the symmetry group of the space itself, and contains the group of symmetries of any figure (subset) of that space.

A Euclidean isometry can be direct or indirect, depending on whether it preserves the handedness of figures.  The direct Euclidean isometries form a subgroup, the special Euclidean group, often denoted SE(n), whose elements are called rigid motions or Euclidean motions. They comprise arbitrary combinations of translations and rotations, but not reflections.

These groups are among the oldest and most studied, at least in the cases of dimension 2 and 3 – implicitly, long before the concept of group was invented.

Overview

Dimensionality

Of these, n can be attributed to available translational symmetry, and the remaining  to rotational symmetry.

Direct and indirect isometries

The direct isometries (i.e., isometries preserving the handedness of chiral subsets) comprise a subgroup of E(n), called the special Euclidean group and usually denoted by E+(n) or  SE(n).   They include the translations and rotations, and combinations thereof; including the identity transformation, but excluding any reflections.

The isometries that reverse handedness are called indirect, or opposite. For any fixed indirect isometry R, such as a reflection about some hyperplane, every other indirect isometry can be obtained by the composition of R with some direct isometry.  Therefore, the indirect isometries are a coset of E+(n), which can be denoted by E−(n).  It follows that the subgroup E+(n) is of index 2 in E(n).

Topology of the group
The natural topology of Euclidean space  implies a topology for the Euclidean group E(n).

Such a function is called a "continuous trajectory" in E(n).

It turns out that the special Euclidean group SE(n) = E+(n) is connected in this topology. On the other hand, the group E(n) as a whole is not connected: there is no continuous trajectory that starts in E+(n) and ends in E−(n).

The continuous trajectories in E(3) play an important role in classical mechanics, because they describe the physically possible movements of a rigid body in three-dimensional space over time. The position and orientation of the body at any  later time t will be described by the transformation f(t). Since f(0) = I is in E+(3), the same must be true of f(t) for any later time. For that reason, the direct Euclidean isometries are also called "rigid motions".

Lie structure

The Euclidean groups are not only topological groups, they are Lie groups, so that calculus notions can be adapted immediately to this setting.

Relation to the affine group
The Euclidean group E(n) is a subgroup of the affine group for n dimensions, and in such a way as to respect the semidirect product structure of both groups. This gives, a fortiori, two ways of writing elements in an explicit notation. These are:

 by a pair , with A an  orthogonal matrix, and b a real column vector of size n; or
 by a single square matrix of size , as explained for the affine group.

Details for the first representation are given in the next section.

In the terms of Felix Klein's Erlangen programme, we read off from this that Euclidean geometry, the geometry of the Euclidean group of symmetries, is, therefore, a specialisation of affine geometry. All affine theorems apply. The origin of Euclidean geometry allows definition of the notion of distance, from which angle can then be deduced.

Detailed discussion

Subgroup structure, matrix and vector representation
The Euclidean group is a subgroup of the group of affine transformations.

It has as subgroups the translational group T(n), and the orthogonal group O(n). Any element of E(n) is a translation followed by an orthogonal transformation (the linear part of the isometry), in a unique way:  where A is an orthogonal matrix

or the same orthogonal transformation followed by a translation:  with 

T(n) is a normal subgroup of E(n): for every translation t and every isometry u, the composition  is again a translation.

In other words, O(n) is (in the natural way) also the quotient group of E(n) by T(n): 

Now SO(n), the special orthogonal group, is a subgroup of O(n) of index two. Therefore, E(n) has a subgroup E+(n), also of index two, consisting of direct isometries. In these cases the determinant of A is 1.

They are represented as a translation followed by a rotation, rather than a translation followed by some kind of reflection (in dimensions 2 and 3, these are the familiar reflections in a mirror line or plane, which may be taken to include the origin, or in 3D, a rotoreflection).

This relation is commonly written as: 
or, equivalently:

Subgroups
Types of subgroups of E(n):
Finite groups.They always have a fixed point. In 3D, for every point there are for every orientation two which are maximal (with respect to inclusion) among the finite groups: Oh and Ih. The groups Ih are even maximal among the groups including the next category.
Countably infinite groups without arbitrarily small translations, rotations, or combinations  i.e., for every point the set of images under the isometries is topologically discrete (e.g., for  a group generated by m translations in independent directions, and possibly a finite point group). This includes lattices. Examples more general than those are the discrete space groups.
Countably infinite groups with arbitrarily small translations, rotations, or combinations  In this case there are points for which the set of images under the isometries is not closed.
Non-countable groups, where there are points for which the set of images under the isometries is not closed  (e.g., in 2D all translations in one direction, and all translations by rational distances in another direction).
Non-countable groups, where for all points the set of images under the isometries is closed  e.g.:
all direct isometries that keep the origin fixed, or more generally, some point (in 3D called the rotation group)
all isometries that keep the origin fixed, or more generally, some point (the orthogonal group)
all direct isometries E+(n)
the whole Euclidean group E(n)
one of these groups in an m-dimensional subspace combined with a discrete group of isometries in the orthogonal (n−m)-dimensional space
one of these groups in an m-dimensional subspace combined with another one in the orthogonal (n−m)-dimensional space

Examples in 3D of combinations:
all rotations about one fixed axis
ditto combined with reflection in planes through the axis and/or a plane perpendicular to the axis
ditto combined with discrete translation along the axis or with all isometries along the axis
a discrete point group, frieze group, or wallpaper group in a plane, combined with any symmetry group in the perpendicular direction
all isometries which are a combination of a rotation about some axis and a proportional translation along the axis; in general this is combined with k-fold rotational isometries about the same axis; the set of images of a point under the isometries is a k-fold helix; in addition there may be a 2-fold rotation about a perpendicularly intersecting axis, and hence a k-fold helix of such axes.
for any point group: the group of all isometries which are a combination of an isometry in the point group and a translation; for example, in the case of the group generated by inversion in the origin: the group of all translations and inversion in all points; this is the generalized dihedral group of R3, Dih(R3).

Overview of isometries in up to three dimensions 
E(1), E(2), and E(3) can be categorized as follows, with degrees of freedom:

Chasles' theorem asserts that any element of E+(3) is a screw displacement.

See also 3D isometries that leave the origin fixed, space group, involution.

Commuting isometries
For some isometry pairs composition does not depend on order:
two translations
two rotations or screws about the same axis
reflection with respect to a plane, and a translation in that plane, a rotation about an axis perpendicular to the plane, or a reflection  with respect to a perpendicular plane
glide reflection with respect to a plane, and a translation in that plane
inversion in a point and any isometry keeping the point fixed
rotation by 180° about an axis and reflection in a plane through that axis
rotation by 180° about an axis and rotation by 180° about a perpendicular axis (results in rotation by 180° about the axis perpendicular to both)
two rotoreflections about the same axis, with respect to the same plane
two glide reflections with respect to the same plane

Conjugacy classes
The translations by a given distance in any direction form a conjugacy class; the translation group is the union of those for all distances.

In 1D, all reflections are in the same class.

In 2D, rotations by the same angle in either direction are in the same class. Glide reflections with translation by the same distance are in the same class.

In 3D:
Inversions with respect to all points are in the same class.
Rotations by the same angle are in the same class.
Rotations about an axis combined with translation along that axis are in the same class if the angle is the same and the translation distance is the same.
Reflections in a plane are in the same class
Reflections in a plane combined with translation in that plane by the same distance are in the same class.
Rotations about an axis by the same angle not equal to 180°, combined with reflection in a plane perpendicular to that axis, are in the same class.

See also
Fixed points of isometry groups in Euclidean space
Euclidean plane isometry
Poincaré group
Coordinate rotations and reflections
Reflection through the origin
Plane of rotation

References
 
 William Thurston. Three-dimensional geometry and topology. Vol. 1. Edited by Silvio Levy. Princeton Mathematical Series, 35. Princeton University Press, Princeton, NJ, 1997. x+311 pp. 

Lie groups